Town Topics may refer to:

 Town Topics (magazine), a defunct New York publication
 Town Topics (musical), a theatrical work by Harry B. Smith
 Town Topics (newspaper), a newspaper in Princeton, New Jersey

See also
Town Talk (disambiguation)